Just to Exist is the second studio album by Irish electronic rock band, All Tvvins. The album was released on 12 April 2019 through Faction Records.

Track listing

References

External links 
 

2019 albums
All Tvvins albums